J. Spencer Lanthier  (born December 17, 1940) is a chartered accountant and corporate director.

Born in Montreal, Quebec, Lanthier was educated at McGill University. In 1960, he joined the accounting firm of Peat, Marwick, Mitchell & Co. in Montreal rising to become partner in 1972. He worked as a Managing Partner in the London, Ontario office from 1977 to 1982, in the Ottawa office from 1982 to 1984, and the Toronto office from 1984 to 1989. From 1989 to 1993, he was Vice-Chairman of the Greater Toronto Area. From 1993 to 1999, he was Chairman and CEO of KPMG Peat Marwick Thorne (renamed to KPMG in 1996).

In 2001, he was appointed  to the Board of Directors of the Bank of Canada. He has also served on the Board of Directors for EllisDon, Emergis Inc., Gerdau AmeriSteel, Rona, Torstar Corporation, TMX Group, Canada Life Assurance Company, Biovail Inc and Zarlink Semiconductor.

In 1999, he was made a Member of the Order of Canada. In 1982, he was awarded F.C.A. by the Ontario Institute of Chartered Accountants. He received the Institute's award of Outstanding Merit in 2002.

References
 Bank of Canada biographical note

1940 births
Living people
Canadian accountants
Canadian corporate directors
Members of the Order of Canada
People from Montreal
KPMG people
McGill University alumni